Telangana Lokayukta  is the parliamentary ombudsman formed by the erstwhile  of Andhra Pradesh under the Andhra Pradesh Lokayukta and Upa-Lokayuktas Act, 83 and adapted by Telangana after getting bifurcated from Andhra Pradesh. The Act became Law from 1st November'83. The passage of Lokpal and Lokayukta's Act, 2013 in Parliament had become law from January 16,2014 and had mandated every state in India to appoint its Lokayukta within a year of its passing. The mission of the Institution of Lokayukta is to eradicate the evil of corruption, favouritism, abuse of position and Power among the public functionaries and improve efficiency and to create cleaner image of the top public functionaries and promote fairness and honesty.

The state Governor appoints Lokayukta on recommendation of the committee consisting of the State Chief Minister, Speaker of Legislative Assembly, Leader of Opposition, Chairman of Legislative Council and Leader of Opposition of Legislative Council.

History and administration 

The Lokayukta Act, 1983 passed in erstwhile joint state of Andhra Pradesh in the year 1983 was accepted by Telangana after its formation in the year 2014. The Lokpal and Lokayukta Act 2013,makes it compulsory for each state to appoint Lokayukta similar to Lokpal at central level for investigation into complaints of corruption against government officers in public offices. The state Lokayukta is currently operating from the Government Building situated in H.No.5-9-49, Basheerbagh, Hyderabad.

In 2019, Telangana Government passed an ordinance that in addition to serving chief Justices or sitting judges even retired Chief Justices or retired Justices can be considered as eligible for appointment for the position as the State Lokayukta.

Powers  

The institution has independent powers to investigate and prosecute any government official or public servants who are covered by the act and against whom complaint is received for abusing his authority for self interest or causes hurt to anyone or any action done intentionally or following corrupt practices negatively impacting the state or individual.

Past Lokayuktas and tenure 

In December 2019,the state Government had appointed retired high court judge CV Ramulu as state Lokayukta and  V Niranjan Rao as the Upa-Lokayukta, as the position was vacant since 2014 when the new state was formed.

Notable cases 

1. In October 2016, on receiving a complaint from Hyderabad city's child rights NGO, 'Balala Hakkula Sangham' (Child Rights Association),the institution had forwarded for enquiry from city's Police regarding a suicide death case of a 13-year-old girl allegedly due to a 68-day fast undertaken by her as part of a particular community ritual.

2. In 2013, the institution had assigned a case and asked for a report from state CID on a petition from few teachers in relation to some teachers getting jobs and promotions on fake certificates.

3. In April 2021, the institution restrained Hyderabad Public School, Ramanthapur from collecting additional fees from its students as the school has collected major part of it giving relief to the students and parents.

Related articles 

The Lokpal and Lokayuktas Act, 2013
Karnataka Lokayukta
Andhra Pradesh Lokayukta
Delhi Lokayukta
Tamilnadu Lokayukta

References

External links 
 official website
 official website

Government of Telangana
Telangana
Lokayuktas